Heartbeat is the seventh studio album by Christian hip hop recording artist Da' T.R.U.T.H., released on April 15, 2014 by Da' T.R.U.T.H.'s own label, Mixed Bag Records. It features artists such as Braille, Capital Kings, Chris August, Lecrae, Papa San, and Tedashii, and production by Black Knight, DJ Corbett, Justin Ebach, Jordin Endow, Epikh Pro, J.R., Joseph Love, Alex Medina, Carlin Muccular and S1.

Style 
Da' T.R.U.T.H. experimented with a wide variety of musical styles on Heartbeat. Branden Murphy noted that the tracks "Loud and Clear" and "Compare" feature a very "pop-ish" sound, "Press" contains a "dash of reggae," "Promises" features a Contemporary Christian music style, and "Mixed Bag" has a boom bap sound. Dwayne Lacey listed off rap, electro, Gospel, CCM, and pop as among the styles featured on the album.

Critical reception

Heartbeat met with generally positive reception from music critics. The four star review by CCM Magazine'''s Andrew Greer was given for the music coming "With a burden for bearing life-changing spiritual truths through his rhyming prowess over thick jams, the gospel hip-hop forerunner enrolls a list of Grammy-winning producers to distribute an LP that is musically both experimental and highly accessible." David Jeffries of AllMusic rated the album three-and-a-half stars out of five, stating that "it's the usual T.R.U.T.H. boldness and brilliance all over again, along with the return of the overabundance issue, although even at 16 tracks, this one only seems overstuffed by about one or two". At New Release Tuesday, Dwayne Lacy rated the album three-and-a-half stars, writing that "this album has so much to offer". Branden Murphy of Wade-O Radio stated that while the album allowed Da' T.R.U.T.H.'s creativity and freedom that comes with recording under his own, newly established label, the wide variety of styles on the album can come across as "scattered" on first listen.

Commercial performance
For the Billboard charting week of May 3, 2014, Heartbeat'' debuted at No. 84 on the Billboard 200, No. 7 and No. 2 on the Christian Albums and Top Gospel Albums charts, respectively, No. 8 on the Rap Albums chart, and No. 16 on the Independent Albums chart.

Track listing

Charts

References

2014 albums
Da' T.R.U.T.H. albums
Albums produced by Symbolyc One